The Lévis City Council is the governing body in the mayor–council government in the city of Lévis, Quebec in the Chaudière-Appalaches region. It is composed of the mayor and 15 councillors.

Current Lévis City Council 
As of the 2013 Quebec municipal elections

 Gilles Lehouillier (Lévis Force 10), mayor

Les Chutes-de-la-Chaudière-Ouest Borough
 Mario Fortier (Lévis Force 10), District 1 (Saint-Étienne) councillor
 Clément Genest (Independent), District 2 (Saint-Nicolas) councillor
 René Fortin (Lévis Force 10), District 3 (Villieu) councillor
 Réjean Lamontagne (Lévis Force 10), District 4 (Saint-Rédempteur) councillor

Les Chutes-de-la-Chaudière-Est Borough
 Michel Patry (Lévis Force 10), District 5 (Charny) councillor
 Michel Turner (Lévis Force 10), District 6 (Breakeyville) councillor
 Guy Dumoulin (Lévis Force 10), District 7 (Saint-Jean) councillor
 Jean-Pierre Bazinet (Lévis Force 10), District 8 (Taniata) councillor
 Brigitte Duchesneau (Lévis Force 10), District 9 (Saint-Romuald) councillor

Desjardins Borough
 Pierre Lainesse (Lévis Force 10), District 10 (Notre-Dame) councillor
 Serge Côté (Lévis Force 10), District 11 (Saint-David) councillor
 Janet Jones (Lévis Force 10), District 12 (Christ-Roi) councillor
 Robert Maranda (Lévis Force 10), District 13 (Bienville) councillor
 Fleur Paradis (Lévis Force 10), District 14 (Lauzon) councillor
 Ann Jeffrey (Lévis Force 10), District 15 (Pintendre) councillor

External links 
 Official website to Lévis 

Municipal councils in Quebec
Politics of Lévis, Quebec